Anton Yuryevich Shibalov (born 25 April 1984) is a Russian rally raid driver who specializes in the truck category.

Career
Shibalov made his Dakar Rally debut in the 2014 edition, finishing in 5th position in the general classification. In the 2020 edition, he achieved his best performance finishing in second position behind his teammate Andrey Karginov.

In other events outside the Dakar Rally, he won the Silk Way Rally in the 2019 edition, having finished second and third in 2017 and 2018 respectively. He has also won the Africa Eco Race three times in the 2013, 2015 and 2016 editions.

Dakar Rally results

2018: On Stage 11 disqualified for omitting control points after his truck caught fire

Winner
Silk Way Rally: 2019
Africa Race: 2013, 2015, 2016
The Great Steppe: 2014, 2015

References

External links
Profile on Dakar Rally
Profile on Kamaz Master

1984 births
Living people
Sportspeople from Moscow
Russian rally drivers
Off-road racing drivers
Rally raid truck drivers
Dakar Rally drivers